Euronorm (also referred to as the European Standard) is an international technical standard for a wide variety of commercial and industrial activities that has been recognized as applicable in the European Union. It has been prepared by CEN member states. The standards may be identical to international standards of the ISO or IEC, or have editorial or technical content changes for applicability in the European Union, with changes annexed to the international standard, or may be originated by a European standards organization. 

The organizations recognized by EU regulations to establish standards include CEN, CENELEC and ETSI.  The current trend in Europe is oriented towards the harmonization of national standards under the Euronorm family. Here, Euronorm becomes the equivalent of a national standard in all member countries and replaces any prior conflicting national standard. For instance, the United Kingdom is gradually replacing its British standards with the BS EN Standards, which is the English language version of the Euronorm.

References

International standards